Leon Barritt (1852–1938) was an American illustrator, cartoonist, journalist, and amateur astronomer. He produced a famous cartoon satirizing Joseph Pulitzer and William Randolph Hearst,  co-invented with Garrett P. Serviss the Barritt–Serviss Star and Planet Finder, a popular star chart sold into the 1950s, and, after losing his artistic ability to paralysis, founded The Monthly Evening Sky Map magazine. Born in Saugerties, New York, he began as a news agent in his home town before moving to Boston to work as an engraver. After a year in Minnesota, he returned to New York in 1884, where he became cartoonist for the New York Press.

Gallery

References

1852 births
1938 deaths
People from Saugerties, New York
American cartoonists
Amateur astronomers